Weston Downtown Residential Historic District is a  national historic district located at Weston, Lewis County, West Virginia. The district includes 193 contributing buildings and 3 contributing structures in a primarily residential district. The dwellings are generally two-story and rest on stone foundations.  They are reflective of popular architectural styles from the 19th and early-20th centuries. The earliest house dates to 1839.  The district includes the separately listed Weston Colored School.

It was listed on the National Register of Historic Places in 2005.

References

Buildings and structures in Lewis County, West Virginia
Historic districts in Lewis County, West Virginia
National Register of Historic Places in Lewis County, West Virginia
Victorian architecture in West Virginia
Historic districts on the National Register of Historic Places in West Virginia